The Jewish Review of Books is a quarterly magazine with articles on literature, culture and current affairs from a Jewish perspective. It is published in Cleveland Heights, Ohio.

The magazine was launched in 2010 with an editorial board that included Michael Walzer and Ruth Wisse, Shlomo Avineri, Ruth Gavison, and other prominent Jewish thinkers. The editor is Abraham Socher, who took a leave of absence from his position as Chair of Jewish Studies at Oberlin College to found the magazine. The initial press run was 30,000 copies. According to The Jewish Week, the JRB is "unabashedly" modeled after the venerable New York Review of Books. Harvey Pekar and Tara Seibel collaborated on comic strips for the first two issues of the magazine.

The magazine was initially funded by the Tikvah Fund, founded by Zalman Bernstein.  In 2022, the publication separated from the Tikvah Fund and is now run independently under the non-profit Jewish Review of Books Foundation, chaired by Jehuda Reinharz, with the Mandel Foundation providing the majority of the funding.

Contributors have included Robert Alter, Elisheva Carlebach, David Ellenson, Daniel Gordis, Moshe Halbertal, Shai Held, Susannah Heschel, Dara Horn, Adam Kirsch, Jonathan Sacks, Haym Soloveitchik, David Wolpe, and Steven Zipperstein.

References

External links

Literary magazines published in the United States
Quarterly magazines published in the United States
Book review magazines
Jewish American culture
Jewish magazines published in the United States
Magazines established in 2010
Magazines published in New York City
Secular Jewish culture in the United States